Causal theory may refer to:
 Causal decision theory of evaluating the expected utility of an action
 Causal sets theory, an approach to quantum physics
 Causal perturbation theory, a mathematically rigorous approach to renormalization theory
 Causal theories, a phenomenon in  social psychology whereby humans guess wrongly about the reasons for their actions (part of the Introspection illusion)